Thomas George Bladon (born December 29, 1952) is a Canadian former professional ice hockey defenceman who played nine seasons in the National Hockey League (NHL) for the Philadelphia Flyers, Pittsburgh Penguins, Edmonton Oilers, Winnipeg Jets and Detroit Red Wings. He won the Stanley Cup with the Flyers in 1974 and 1975.

Playing career
He is best remembered for the game played on December 11, 1977, against the Cleveland Barons, in which he scored four goals and added four assists, becoming the first defenceman and only the fourth person in NHL history to record eight points (a feat accomplished only 16 times by 13 other players) in an NHL game. His plus/minus of +10 in that game is also an NHL record.  Bladon's heavy slapshot from the point was a fixture of the Flyer's championship teams from the 1970s.

Career statistics

Awards
 WCHL Second All-Star Team – 1972

References

External links
 
Tom Bladon Sets Defenseman Record

1952 births
Living people
Adirondack Red Wings players
Canadian ice hockey defencemen
Detroit Red Wings players
Edmonton Oil Kings (WCHL) players
Edmonton Oilers players
National Hockey League All-Stars
Philadelphia Flyers draft picks
Philadelphia Flyers players
Pittsburgh Penguins players
Ice hockey people from Edmonton
Stanley Cup champions
Tim Hortons
Winnipeg Jets (1979–1996) players